Cyberpunks is a top down shooter game for the Amiga developed by Mutation and published by Core Design in 1993.

The player controls three characters simultaneously. Game play consists of shooting enemy aliens and locating several door passes before being able to move onto the next level.

References

External links

1993 video games
Amiga games
Amiga-only games
Core Design games
Shoot 'em ups
Single-player video games
Top-down video games
Video games developed in the United Kingdom